The Hobart Hurricanes (WBBL) are a women's Twenty20 cricket team based in Bellerive, Tasmania. They compete in the Women's Big Bash League.

History

Formation
One of eight founding WBBL teams, the Hobart Hurricanes are aligned with the men's team of the same name. At the official WBBL launch on 10 July 2015, Julie Hunter was unveiled as the team's first-ever player signing. Julia Price was appointed as the Hurricanes' inaugural coach, while Heather Knight became the inaugural captain.

The Hurricanes played their first match on 11 December against the Melbourne Renegades at Aurora Stadium, winning by 35 runs.

Rivalries

Melbourne Stars
The Hurricanes and Melbourne Stars have combined to produce an inordinate amount of matches with close finishes, including:

 16 January 2016, Blacktown ISP Oval: On a crumbling pitch, criticised earlier in the Australian summer for its sub-standard preparation, the Stars crawled to a first innings total of 7/96 before fighting back to have the Hurricanes at 4/49 in the twelfth over of the run chase. An unbroken stand of 48 runs from the next 51 balls between Corinne Hall and Amy Satterthwaite steered Hobart out of trouble, with Hall scoring a single on the final delivery to secure victory for the 'Canes.
 20 January 2017, Blundstone Arena: In a rain-affected encounter, Hobart posted a first innings total of 3/115 off 14 overs. Chasing a revised target of 98 from twelve overs, Melbourne lost 4/7 late in the match (including the wicket of Emma Inglis for 51 off 31) to leave a required twelve runs from the last two balls for victory. Jess Cameron proceeded to hit a six off the penultimate legal delivery before Hurricanes off-spinner Amy Satterthwaite bowled a front-foot no-ball while also conceding a four on what would have otherwise been the final ball of the innings. With Satterthwaite having to bowl the final delivery again, Cameron scored the remaining single needed to pull off an unlikely six-wicket win for the Stars.
 21 January 2017, Blundstone Arena: The following morning, on the last day of the WBBL|02 regular season, the Stars and Hurricanes met again—this time in what was effectively a quarter-final knockout match with the winner progressing to the semi-finals and the loser being eliminated from the tournament. Meg Lanning made 81 runs for the Stars in the first innings, earning Player of the Match honours, but was dismissed in the 19th over by a stunning Julie Hunter catch at square leg. A spell of 3/11 off four overs by Kristen Beams was not enough to defend the target of 136 as the Hurricanes scored the winning runs (through Corinne Hall again) with four wickets in hand and one ball remaining.

Sydney Sixers
The Hurricanes and Sydney Sixers have met in two semi-finals:
 22 January 2016, Melbourne Cricket Ground: In a match initially shortened to 14 overs per side due to rain, the higher-ranked Hurricanes struggled in the first innings, managing a score of just 8/86. Further rain delays meant the Sixers' target was revised to 55 runs from eight overs, under the Duckworth–Lewis–Stern method. Sydney cruised to victory with all ten wickets in hand and ten balls remaining. Veteran off-spinner Lisa Sthalekar was named Player of the Match for her bowling figures of 3/9 from three overs.
 25 January 2017, The Gabba: Acting captain Alyssa Healy belted 77 runs off 45 balls to help the Sixers to 6/169 in the first innings. In reply, the Hurricanes were skittled for a miserly 66 runs, setting a new WBBL record for lowest all out total. The 103-run margin also set a new WBBL record for the largest victory by a team batting first.

The Sixers defeated the Hurricanes in their first eleven encounters, setting a WBBL record for the longest head-to-head winning streak. The Hurricanes finally defeated the Sixers on their twelfth attempt:
 20 November 2019, North Sydney Oval: With captain Ellyse Perry sidelined due to a shoulder injury, the Sixers faltered early to a score of 5/30. A resurgence, led by Marizanne Kapp's unbeaten 55 off 40 balls, helped Sydney to a total of 7/134. Hobart's chase got off to a shaky start as they found themselves down 4/22 after five overs. A healthy partnership between batters Nicola Carey and Corinne Hall came to an end in the 15th over when Hall was spectacularly caught by former Hurricanes player Erin Burns in the outfield. With 44 runs required from the final 33 deliveries, Carey went on to make 55 not out while a quickfire 29 by Chloe Tryon sealed victory for the Hurricanes with five wickets in hand and ten balls remaining. In addition to snapping their elongated head-to-head losing streak, the win set a new mark for Hobart's highest successful run chase. Belinda Vakarewa, who sliced through the Sixers' top-order, was named Player of the Match for her bowling figures of 4/19.

Captaincy records

There have been six captains in the Hurricanes' history, including matches featuring an acting captain.

Source:

Season summaries

Home grounds

Players

Current squad

Australian representatives
 The following is a list of cricketers who have played for the Hurricanes after making their debut in the national women's team (the period they spent as both a Hurricanes squad member and an Australian-capped player is in brackets):

Overseas marquees

Associate rookies

Statistics and awards

Team stats
Champions: 0
Runners-up: 0
Minor premiers: 0
 Win–loss record:

 Highest score in an innings: 6/196 (20 overs) vs Melbourne Stars, 9 December 2018
 Highest successful chase: 4/147 (19.2 overs) vs Melbourne Stars, 27 October 2021
 Lowest successful defence: 7/117 (20 overs) vs Adelaide Strikers, 12 December 2015
 Largest victory:
 Batting first: 72 runs vs Melbourne Stars, 9 December 2018
 Batting second: 56 balls remaining vs Melbourne Renegades, 7 November 2022
 Longest winning streak: 5 matches
 Longest losing streak: 10 matches

Source:

Individual stats
 Most runs: Heather Knight – 1,353
 Highest score in an innings:  Rachel Priest – 107* (68) vs Melbourne Stars, 19 October 2021
 Highest partnership: Rachel Priest and Hayley Matthews – 127* vs Sydney Sixers, 14 November 2020
 Most wickets: Nicola Carey – 51
 Best bowling figures in an innings: Amy Satterthwaite – 5/17 (4 overs) vs Sydney Thunder, 16 January 2017
 Hat-tricks taken: Amy Satterthwaite vs Sydney Thunder, 16 January 2017
 Most catches (fielder): Heather Knight – 28
 Most dismissals (wicket-keeper): Georgia Redmayne – 30 (18 catches, 12 stumpings)

Source:

Individual awards
 Player of the Match:
 Hayley Matthews – 5
 Heather Knight, Amy Satterthwaite – 4 each
 Mignon du Preez, Rachel Priest, Belinda Vakarewa – 3 each
 Nicola Carey, Heather Graham, Corinne Hall – 2 each
 Erin Burns,  Erin Fazackerley, Maisy Gibson, Brooke Hepburn, Julie Hunter, Ruth Johnston, Lizelle Lee, Smriti Mandhana, Molly Strano – 1 each

 WBBL Team of the Tournament:
Heather Knight – WBBL01
 Veronica Pyke – WBBL|01
 Molly Strano – WBBL08
 Belinda Vakarewa – WBBL05
Tayla Vlaeminck – WBBL07

Sponsors

See also

Cricket Tasmania
Hobart Hurricanes
Tasmanian Roar

References

Notes

External links
 

 
Women's Big Bash League teams
Cricket in Tasmania
Cricket clubs established in 2015
2015 establishments in Australia
Sport in Hobart